The 2020–21 SPHL season is the 17th season of the Southern Professional Hockey League (SPHL). Due to the ongoing restrictions amid the COVID-19 pandemic, the start of the season was delayed to December 26, 2020, and only half of the member teams participated in the shortened season.

League business
Due to the COVID-19 pandemic, the 2019–20 season was curtailed and no champion was named. For the 2020–21 season, the league announced the Evansville Thunderbolts, Fayetteville Marksmen, Peoria Rivermen, Quad City Storm, and Roanoke Rail Yard Dawgs had withdrawn from participating in the season due to pandemic-related capacity restrictions barring fans from attending games.

Regular season

Standings
Final standings:

‡ William B. Coffey Trophy winners
 Qualified for playoffs

President's Cup playoffs
For 2021, the top four teams at the end of the regular season qualified for the playoffs.

Playoff bracket

Awards

All-SPHL selections

References

External links
Southern Professional Hockey League website

Southern Professional Hockey League seasons
Sphl